Independent Democratic Confederation of Nepalese Union (INDECONT) is a national trade union center in Nepal. INDECONT claims 13 affiliated unions.

References 

National trade union centers of Nepal
National federations of trade unions

Trade unions established in 2003
2003 establishments in Nepal